The Pennsylvania High School Speech League is a high school forensics league. The PHSSL state championship takes place yearly in March at Bloomsburg University. Each qualifying event contains 2 qualifiers from each district throughout Pennsylvania, and the non-qualifying events have one student from each participating school.

History of PHSSL 

PHSSL was founded in 1961, by Dr. Robert E. Dunham, to promote speaking throughout the entire state of Pennsylvania at Penn State University. The actual championship took place at Susquehanna University from 1992 through 2016. The PA High School Speech League moved to Bloomsburg University in June, 2016 and will begin hosting the PA State Drama Festival in January 2017 and will host the PA State Championship Tournament in March 2017. The championship has always been considered the "state championship" in Pennsylvania by allowing all schools to compete regardless of state affiliation.

Publications

The Pennsylvania High School Speech League publishes its own newsletter which is titled "The Communicator". PHSSL uses "The Communicator" to put forth information regarding leadership in the organization, plans, and records of student performance in the state championship.

Leaders

The Pennsylvania High School Speech League chooses the officers in the organization based on their merit and dedication to promoting forensics. The election of officers is a democratic process. As of June 2016, the current leaders include:
Executive Director
Dr. Harry C. "Neil" Strine IV - Bloomsburg University
Secretary
Jodi Fetterolf - Bloomsburg University
Board Members
John Buettler- Holy Ghost Preparatory School
Keith Brosious - Elk Lake High School
Stacey Givens Cawley - Baldwin High School
Barb Giuliano- Saint Joseph's Preparatory School
Lisa Bompiani-Smith - Greater Latrobe High School
David R. Long - Southern Lehigh High School
Reed H. Messmore - Selinsgrove Area High School
Bill Murray - Mechanicsburg Area High School
W. Michael Nailor - Danville High School
Kathleen O’Halloran - Norwin High School
Hugh P. Ringer - Mercer Area High School
Aditya Dhere - Pine-Richland High School
Beth Young - North Catholic High School
Ben Edwars - Upper St. Clair High School
Dr. Neil Strine - Bloomsburg University
Dr. Leslie Rogne Schumacher - University of Pennsylvania
District Chairs
District 1 - Hugh P. Ringer Mercer Area High School & Bob Hall Fairview High School
District 2 - Aditya Dhere Pine Richland High School
District 3 - Ben Edwards Upper St. Clair High School
District 4 - Lisa Bompiani-Smith Greater Latrobe High School
District 5 - Cassie Thomas Windber Area High School
District 6 - Paige Stonge West Shore Christian Academy
District 7 - Tiffany Dacheux Dallastown Area High School
District 8 - Jessica Niemiec Holy Redeemer High School & David Long Southern Lehigh High School
District 9 - Ellen Boyer Shikellamy High School
District 10 - Bonnie Perry Harriton High School
District 11 - Cory Shay Gwynedd Mercy Academy
District 12 - Chris Berdnik Pennsbury High School
District 14 - Holly Smith Penn Cambria High School
District 15 - Ashley Murphy Unionville High School

Hall of Fame
PHSSL has created a hall of fame for great participants, coaches, and supporters of forensics. The Pennsylvania High School Speech League's hall of fame came into existence in 1986, and has inducted at least one member ever since.

Elected Members of PHSSL Hall of Fame

 2019 RITA YUNKER,  Bishop Canevin High School
 2018 CORY CLARK SHAY, Gwynedd Mercy Academy
 2017 CAROL LESHOCK, Greensburg-Saleme High School
 2017 KALE FITHIAN, McDowell High School
 2016 JERRY COLAPINTO, Holy Ghost Preparatory School, Bensalem
 2015 KATHY HEWSTON, Hempfield Area Senior High School, Greensburg
 2014 KATHRYN GINGERICH, Red Land High School, Lewisberry
 2014 STEPHEN MEDOFF, Pennsbury High School, Fairless Fields
 2013 CHRISTINE METCALFE, Mechanicsburg High School, Mechanicsburg
 2013 JOHN V. ROCHE, Nazareth Academy High School, Philadelphia
 2012 TIM WAXENFELTER, Quigley Catholic High School, Baden
 2011 KEITH BROSIOUS, Elk Lake High School, Dimock
 2010 DAVID LONG, Southern Lehigh High School, Center Valley
 2010 SANDRA W. SAXMAN, Secretary, Pennsylvania HS Speech League, Selinsgrove
 2010 LARRY D. AUGUSTINE, Director, Pennsylvania HS Speech League, Selinsgrove
 2009 SHARON VOLPE, North Allegheny High School, Wexford
 2010 ROBERTA RINGER, Mercer Area High School, Mercer
 2007 VICKY TRIMMER, Mechanicsburg Area High School, Mechanicsburg
 2007 MARSHA K. WILLIAMS, Greensburg-Salem High School, Greensburg
 2006 ELLEN BOYER, Shikellamy High School, Sunbury
 2005 MARY FURLONG, Delone Catholic, McSherrystown (RETIRED)
 2004 ROBERT CASEY, Trinity High School, Camp Hill
 2003 CARL W. ASKEW, Shikellamy High School, Sunbury
 2002 REV. RAYMOND HAHN, Cathedral Preparatory, Erie
 2002 KATHLEEN O'HALLORAN, Norwin High School, North Huntingdon
 2001 MARIA CARUSI, Gwynedd Mercy Academy (Posthumously)
 2001 ALICE URSIN, Bethel Park High School, Bethel Park
 2000 SALLY FINLEY, Belle Vernon High School, Belle Vernon
 2000 JAMES WILLIG, (Posthumously), Lancaster Catholic, Lancaster
 1999 NO AWARD GIVEN
 1998 WILLIAM MURRAY, Mechanicsburg High School, Mechanicsburg
 1998 ANTHONY STOKES, The Kiski School, Saltsburg
 1997 ROYCE RICE, North Hills High School, Pittsburgh
 1997 HUGH RINGER, Mercer Area High School, Mercer
 1996 JOHN BUETTLER, Holy Ghost Preparatory, Bensalem
 1996 JANET DICENZO, Kennedy-Kennrick Catholic, Plymouth Meeting
 1996 ANTHONY FIGLIOLA, Holy Ghost Preparatory, Bensalem
 1995 W. MICHAEL NAILOR, Danville High School
 1995 MARY ANN YOSKEY-BERTY, Trinity High School
 1995 BETH YOUNG, North Catholic High School
 1994 RALPH KARN, Keystone Oaks High School, Pittsburgh
 1994 JANET ROBB, McKeesport Area High School, McKeesport
 1993 MARGARET EMELSON, Uniontown High School, Uniontown
 1992 GLENN CAVANAUGH, Derry Area High School, Derry
 1992 CARL GRECCO, Truman High School, Levittown
 1992 GLORIA WASILEWSKI, Riverside High School, Ellwood City
 1991 THOMAS FARR, Shikellamy/Danville High School(s)
 1990 MARILYN ENGLEHART, Central Cambria High School
 1990 FATHER TOM MEULEMANS, Archmere Academy
 1989 EDWIN KELLY, Pennsbury High School
 1989 CALLISTUS W. MILAN, Retired
 1988 HOWARD FEDRICK, Retired
 1988 PEGGY ANN MADDEN, North Hills High School
 1987 THELMA CARUSO, Charleroi High School
 1987 ELEANOR LANGAN, Scranton Central High School
 1986 ROBERT E. DUNHAM, Vice President of Academic Services, PSU
 1986 JEANNE M. LUTZ, Director, Pennsylvania High School Speech League
 1986 BERYL MCCLAIN, Retired
 1986 SISTER ST. IRMINUS, Retired
 1986 BROTHER RENE STERNER, Principal, Calvert Hall College

P.H.S.S.L. Events 

PHSSL features many events, most of which are qualified for at district tournaments, but several are coach given bids.
A list of events from the PHSSL Website:

Drama: Competition in drama is held at the regional and state levels. A school performs a one-act play or cutting of a longer work with more than two characters. Two schools advance from each region to the state finals. Competitions are held during the first semester.

Policy Debate: A clash of two, two-person teams, one affirmative and one negative, on the annual national policy resolution. The affirmative presents a case for change in the present system. The negative supports the present system or a counter-proposal for change.

Public Forum Debate: A clash of two 2-person teams, one pro and one con on a contemporary resolution. National topics change every month.

Lincoln-Douglas Debate: A clash of two debaters, one affirmative and one negative, on a values topic.

Parliamentary Debate: A clash of two 3-person teams, one for the resolution and one against the resolution. Rounds can be either on a prepared topic or an impromptu topic chosen 30 minutes before the start of the round. Topics are chosen by the Executive Board for the District and State Tournaments.

Oral Interpretation of Poetry: A contestant interprets with script in hand one or more poems. Time limit: 10 minutes.

Oral Interpretation of Prose: A contestant interprets with script in hand a cutting from a short story or novel. Time limit: 10 minutes.

Dramatic Interpretation: A contestant chooses a cutting from a serious play and memorizes it. The student recreates the scene using appropriate gestures and voices. Time limit: 10 minutes.

Humorous Interpretation: A contestant chooses a cutting from a humorous play and memorizes it. The student recreates the scene using appropriate gestures and voices. Time limit: 10 minutes.

Informative Speaking: Original speeches teach or explain a concept or idea. Time limit: 7 minutes.

Extemporaneous Speaking: A contestant is provided three current events topic on politics, economics, or culture to choose from and selects one. Preparation time: 30 minutes. Time limit: 7 minutes.

Persuasive Speaking: Original speeches convince the audience. Time limit: 10 minutes.

Extemporaneous Commentary: A continuation of both extemporaneous and persuasive speaking. It can be both informative and advocative. Knowledge of events and some history is required. Contestants seated at a table or desk for the presentation. Preparation time: 30 minutes. Time limit: 7 minutes.

Duo Interpretation of Literature: “Literature” is defined as a single stage, screen, television, radio play, fictional or non-fictional work or poem. All selections must be published or commercially available in print, audio, or video form. Time limit: 10 minutes.

In addition, competition in the following events are held at the state level only:

Radio Announcing: A contestant presents a two-minute news broadcast. In subsequent rounds, prepared scripts are used.

Impromptu Speaking: In a limited amount of time a student prepares a brief speech on topics such as proverbs, aphorisms or quotations. Preparation time: 5 minutes. Time limit: 5 minutes.

Student Congress: In this event students take on the roles of legislators. Using parliamentary procedure, students debate bills and resolutions on current issues.

Results: Overall Team State Championship 

2019 - Upper St. Clair High School
2018 - North Allegheny High School
2017 - Upper St. Clair High School
2016 - Holy Ghost Preparatory
2015 - North Allegheny High School
2014 - North Allegheny High School
2013 - Holy Ghost Preparatory
2012 - Danville High School
2011 - McDowell High School
2010 - Holy Ghost Preparatory
2009 - Holy Ghost Preparatory
2008 - Holy Ghost Preparatory
2007 - Holy Ghost Preparatory
2006 - Mount Lebanon High School 
2005 - Holy Ghost Preparatory
2004 - Holy Ghost Preparatory
2003 - Holy Ghost Preparatory
2002 - Holy Ghost Preparatory
2001 - Scranton High School 
2000 - Holy Ghost Preparatory
1999 - Holy Ghost Preparatory
1998 - Holy Ghost Preparatory
1997 - Holy Ghost Preparatory
1996 - Holy Ghost Preparatory
1995 - Holy Ghost Preparatory
1994 - Scranton High School
1993 - Scranton High School  
1992 - Scranton High School
1991 - Scranton Central High School  
1990 - Scranton Central High School     
1989 - Scranton Central High School   
1988 - Scranton Central High School   
1987 - Scranton Central High School  
1986 - Scranton Central High School  
1985 - Scranton Central High School  
1984 - LaSalle College High School
1983 - Scranton Central High School  
1982 - Holy Ghost Preparatory  
1981 - Holy Ghost Preparatory
1980 - Shikellamy High School 
1979 - Shikellamy High School 
1978 - Pennsbury High School
1977 - Central District Catholic High
1976 - Scranton Central High School
1975 - Central District Catholic High  
1974 - Central District Catholic High
1973 - Pennsbury High School
1972 - Pennsbury High School
1971 - Central District Catholic High
1970 - Scranton Central High School  
1969 - Central District Catholic High
1968 - Scranton Central High School   
1967 - Central District Catholic High
1966 - Central District Catholic High
1965 - Central District Catholic High
1964 - Cathedral Preparatory School

See also 

Competitive debate in the United States
National Catholic Forensic League
National Forensic League

References

External links 
PHSSL Website

Organizations based in Pennsylvania
Student debating societies